June is a home automation company based in San Francisco. Its first product was the June Intelligent Oven, a computer-based, Wi-Fi-enabled, app-connected countertop convection oven that employs machine learning and computer vision technologies to identify and cook food. The first generation oven was launched in December 2016. June launched its second generation June Oven in August 2018 as the "do-it-all oven" and  seven appliances in one - a countertop convection oven, air fryer, slow cooker, dehydrator, broiler, toaster and warming drawer. The oven was created by “a team that brought the iPhone, the Fitbit, the GoPro, and Lyft to market.”

History 

June was founded by Matt Van Horn, CEO, and Nikhil Bhogal, CTO, and launched in June 2015.
Van Horn co-founded Zimride, which spun off the ride-sharing service Lyft. Bhogal designed the camera software for the iPhone’s first five generations and is listed as an inventor on multiple Apple camera software patents. June team members have worked on the Apple Watch, GoPro cameras and Fitbit fitness trackers as well.  Michelin-starred chef Michael Mina is an advisor to June.

Design 

The oven is controlled by a 5-inch touch screen and connected app. Programmable and sensor-driven, the oven uses a built-in scale, core-temperature thermometer and a camera to suggest cooking time and temperature. The internal high-definition camera with a fisheye lens that is designed to recognize commonly cooked foods. The company claims the oven’s optical recognition can identify foods such as frozen pizza, bacon, Brussels sprouts, asparagus, and potatoes and can differentiate between different types of fish.

Hardware 

The June Oven has dual-surround convection fans, digital TRIAC controllers, a GPU processor, a 2.3-gigahertz NVIDIA chip, and carbon-fiber heating elements.  Ammunition Design Group aided with the industrial design of the June Oven and Quanta Computer aided in the manufacturing.

Software 

The iOS and Android apps display a live-stream video of the inside of the oven and then sends a notification when the food is done. The iOS app, June Cookbook, also has “connected recipes” that illustrate cooking steps with videos and you can set your preferences with the oven.

Funding 

June received $7 million in Series A funding from the Foundry Group, First Round Capital, Lerer Ventures, and Founders Fund.

Acquisition 

On January 12, 2021, it was announced that June was acquired by Weber Inc. for an undisclosed amount. Following the acquisition, it will exist as a “strategic business unit” within Weber. Co-founder Matt Van Horn will serve as president of June while the company's other co-founder, Nikhil Bhogal, will become senior vice president, technology and connected devices of Weber. Van Horn will continue to focus on June Oven while Bhogal will work with Weber R&D programs and new products.

References 

Manufacturing companies based in San Francisco
2021 mergers and acquisitions
2015 establishments in California
Electronics companies established in 2015
American companies established in 2015
Home automation companies
Home appliance manufacturers of the United States